Need Your Love is the sixth album from the Japanese band Do As Infinity. It was released on February 16, 2005. The first (pre-album) single release from Need Your Love was "Rakuen", also featured in the fourth movie in the InuYasha anime series. Several other songs from the album, including "For the Future" and "Be Free", have been featured on Japanese television, as well as Yotaka no Yume being featured as the opening theme of Zoids Genesis. Five different editions of this album were released, CD, CD+DVD, CD+DVD+T-shirt Van design, CD+DVD+T-shirt Ryo design, and SACD.

Track listing

Chart positions

External links
 Need Your Love at Avex Network
 Need Your Love at Oricon

2005 albums
Do As Infinity albums
Avex Group albums
Albums produced by Seiji Kameda